Abdullah is a 1980 Indian Bollywood romantic drama film that was directed by Sanjay Khan. It stars Raj Kapoor, Sanjay Khan, Zeenat Aman, Danny Denzongpa in main roles, along with Sanjeev Kumar, Madan Puri, Sujit Kumar, Mehmood, Om Prakash, Kader Khan, Farida Jalal in minor roles. The story was written by George Marzbetuny and Kader Khan wrote the dialogues. It was one of the most expensive Indian films at the time.

Plot
In an unspecified Arab country, Khaleel is a dangerous outlaw bringing terror to the land. Sheikh Mohammed Al-Kamal is a man of honour, who helps to protect people from harm and is asked by the government to help search for Khaleel. The quest to bring Khaleel to justice becomes a personal one for the Sheikh when his wife Zainab is injured during a bungled kidnap attempt by Khaleel.

Abdullah is a devout Muslim who lives in a small hut in the middle of the desert, and looks after a well which provides water to thirsty travelers. One day a friend, Ameer, informs him that Khaleel had raided a settlement nearby, killing everyone except for Yashoda, a pregnant woman. Shortly thereafter, Ameer himself is killed, a mortally wounded Yashoda gives birth to a boy, names him Krishna, asks Abdullah to care for him, and passes away. Abdullah overcomes his fears of bringing up a Hindu boy, and looks after Krishna as his own son.

One day Khaleel's magician informs him that he is going to die at the hands of Krishna. Just as the Hindu deity Krishna once slew Kansa, his maternal uncle, so also will Khaleel's life end at this Krishna's hands. Angered by this, Khaleel sets out to kill Krishna. He attacks Abdullah, abducts Krishna and readies to kill the boy to get rid of any threat against him. In response, Abdullah and the Sheikh set out to stop this and to deal with Khaleel once and for all.

Cast
Raj Kapoor as Abdullah
Sanjay Khan as Shaikh Mohammed-Al-Qamaal
Zeenat Aman as Zainab 
Danny Denzongpa as Khaleel
Sujit Kumar as Jamaal
Mehmood as Ahmed
Om Prakash as Hindu Priest
Sanjeev Kumar as Ameer 
Madan Puri as Military Commander
Kader Khan as Military Officer
Farida Jalal as Yashoda
Rajeev Bhatia as Krishna
Nazir Hussain as Blind Man
Bob Christo as Magician 
Helen as Item Dancer in song "Jashn-E-Bahaara"

Soundtrack
The music was composed by R. D. Burman. Lyrics written by Anand Bakshi.

Box office
Abdullah grossed 3.4 crore at the domestic Indian box office, making it 1980's 17th highest-grossing film in India. However, the film's performance at the domestic box office was deemed below average. 

Despite under-performing at the domestic Indian box office, the film became an overseas blockbuster at the Soviet box office, due to Raj Kapoor's popularity in the Soviet Union. It drew an audience of 31.9 million Soviet viewers in 1983, the highest for an Indian film that year, making it one of the top 30 most popular Indian films in the Soviet Union.

References

External links 
 

Films scored by R. D. Burman
1980 films
1980s Hindi-language films
Films set in Asia